Thomas Sexton (July 3, 1957 – December 13, 1993) was a Canadian comedian. Born in St. John's, Newfoundland, he was the youngest member of the CODCO comedy troupe.

Educated in St. John's, he was an honours student before quitting after Grade 10 to pursue an acting career in Toronto. After briefly working on a children's touring theatre show, he landed his first television role in the drama series Police Surgeon. Sexton and colleague Diane Olsen subsequently wrote Cod on a Stick, a comedic play which launched CODCO.

In 1975, Sexton took a brief sabbatical from CODCO to study at the Toronto Dance Theatre. He subsequently returned, working on other shows with CODCO and subsequently touring with colleague Greg Malone in two co-written works, The Wonderful Grand Band and Two Foolish to Talk About. In 1985 and 1986, Sexton and Malone wrote and performed in a series of television specials for the CBC, called The S and M Comic Book, which in turn led to CODCO landing its own series in 1987.

After CODCO's run concluded in 1993, Sexton and Malone wrote and starred in a CBC television special, The National Doubt, satirizing the constitutional debates of the early 1990s. Sexton subsequently wrote a semi-autobiographical film, Adult Children of Alcoholics: The Musical, which was in production in November 1993 when Sexton, who was openly gay, fell ill due to complications from AIDS. He died on December 13 of that year.

Malone subsequently campaigned for HIV and AIDS education in Sexton's memory. His sister, filmmaker Mary Sexton, produced a documentary film about him, Tommy...A Family Portrait, in 2001. Along with Malone and their CODCO co-star Andy Jones, Sexton was a posthumous recipient of the Earle Grey Award, the lifetime achievement award of Canadian television's Gemini Awards, in 2002.

The Tommy Sexton Centre, a new assisted housing complex for people living with HIV and AIDS, was opened in St. John's in 2006. In 2009, several drag queens in the city put together "Ravishing in Red", a tribute show to Sexton, as a fundraiser for the Sexton Centre. One performer, Betty "Boo" Kakke, singled him out as Newfoundland's "clown prince".

Sexton's mother, Sara Sexton, became a major figure in HIV/AIDS awareness in Newfoundland and Labrador following her son's death. Sara Sexton was announced as an inductee to the Order of Newfoundland and Labrador in 2013, and was inducted in February 2014.

References

External links
 

1957 births
1993 deaths
Male actors from Newfoundland and Labrador
AIDS-related deaths in Canada
Canadian television personalities
Gay comedians
People from St. John's, Newfoundland and Labrador
Canadian gay actors
Canadian male television actors
20th-century Canadian male actors
Canadian sketch comedians
20th-century Canadian comedians
Comedians from Newfoundland and Labrador
Canadian male comedians
20th-century Canadian LGBT people
Canadian LGBT comedians